Lepeostegeres cebuensis is a species of mistletoe recently described which is found on Cebu Island, Philippines. Currently this is treated as an unplaced name by Plants of the world online.

References

Flora of the Visayas
Loranthaceae
Plants described in 2016
Taxa named by Daniel Lee Nickrent
Taxa named by Pieter B. Pelser
Taxa named by Julie F. Barcelona